Aaron Copland's Clarinet Concerto (also referred to as the Concerto for clarinet, strings and harp) was written between 1947 and 1949, although a first version was available in 1948. The concerto was later choreographed by Jerome Robbins for the ballet Pied Piper (1951).

History

Composition
Soon after Copland composed his Symphony No. 3, in 1947 jazz clarinetist Benny Goodman commissioned him to write a concerto for clarinet. Goodman told Copland biographer Vivian Perlis:
I made no demands on what Copland should write. He had completely free rein, except that I should have a two-year exclusivity on playing the work. I paid two thousand dollars and that's real money. At the time there were not too many American composers to pick from... We never had much trouble except for a little fracas about the spot before the cadenza where he had written a repetition of some phrase. I was a little sticky about leaving it out—it was where the viola was the echo to give the clarinet a cue. But I think Aaron finally did leave it out... Aaron and I played the concerto quite a few times with him conducting, and we made two recordings"
Copland was in Rio de Janeiro in 1947 as a lecturer and conductor. While there he made many drafts of the concerto.
On August 26, 1948, Copland wrote that the concerto was still "dribbling along". A month later, he wrote in a letter that the piece was almost done.
On December 6, 1948, he wrote to composer Carlos Chávez that he had completed the composition and was pleased with the result.

Copland accepted a commission from conductor Serge Koussevitzky to arrange the concerto's first movement as an Elegy for Strings, to be performed by the Boston Symphony. However, in a letter to Koussevitzky dated August 29, 1950, Copland backed away from the commission. The composer explained that, after further thought, he believed that performing an arrangement of the first movement by itself "takes away from the integrity of the Concerto as I originally conceived it, and I am basically unwilling to do that". Copland was also concerned, he wrote, that a performance of the concerto's first movement by itself when the concerto still had not been performed—Goodman repeatedly postponed his premier of the piece—might be misperceived by the public as expressing doubt about the quality of the concerto's second movement. He proposed a different way to satisfy his commitment for an elegy.

Performances

Benny Goodman premiered the concerto on an NBC radio broadcast with the NBC Symphony Orchestra conducted by Fritz Reiner, on November 6, 1950.
 
Some claim this performance, however, was not the world premiere, and attribute the world premiere to Ralph McLane and the Philadelphia Orchestra under Eugene Ormandy because this performance on November 28, 1950 was the first "public performance". In any case it was the first public performance of the Concerto in New York.

This November 28, 1950 performance —probably just beyond the end of the two-year exclusivity— had been scheduled by Copland to increase pressure on Goodman, since he kept on putting off the first performance.
A recording of the first radio performance by Goodman, with the NBC Symphony Orchestra under the baton of Fritz Reiner is available on CD on the Legend music label (see below).
 
The concerto quickly established itself as a standard piece in the clarinet repertoire. Since the performance by Benny Goodman, other notable performances include those by:
Stanley Drucker and the New York Philharmonic with Leonard Bernstein
Milenko Stefanović and the Belgrade Philharmonic Orchestra with Aaron Copland (Belgrade, June 2, 1961)
Richard Stoltzman and the London Symphony Orchestra with Michael Tilson Thomas
Paul Meyer and the English Chamber Orchestra
Sabine Meyer and the Bamberger Symphoniker

However, one particular recording of note is the one with Goodman and conducted by Copland himself, which Aaron Copland considered to be his best recording ever.

Style and structure
Copland incorporated many jazz elements into his concerto.

Mellers —Copland being representative of the American "Other"— links Copland’s affinity for jazz elements with the fact that “both Negro and Jew are dispossessed people who have become, in a cosmopolitan urban society, representative of man’s uprootedness.”

Copland himself acknowledged that his signature "bittersweet lyricism" like in the first movement of the Clarinet Concerto may have been influenced by his feelings of loneliness and social alienation over his homosexuality.

On the piece, Copland writes:
"The instrumentation being clarinet with strings, harp, and piano, I did not have a large  battery of percussion to achieve jazzy effects, so I used slapping basses and whacking harp sounds to simulate them. The Clarinet Concerto ends with a fairly elaborate coda in C major
that finishes off with a clarinet glissando – or "smear" in jazz lingo."
The piece is written in a very unusual form. The two movements are played back-to-back, linked by a clarinet cadenza. The first movement is written in A-B-A form and is slow and expressive, full of bittersweet lyricism. The cadenza not only gives the soloist an opportunity to display his virtuosity, but also introduces many of the melodic  Latin American jazz themes that dominate the second movement.

The overall form of the final movement is a free rondo with several developing side issues that resolve in the end with an elaborate coda in C major.  Copland noted that his playful finale is born of 
"an unconscious fusion of elements obviously related to North and South American popular music (for example, a phrase from a currently popular Brazilian tune, heard by me in Rio, became embedded in the secondary material)."
This section was written specially for Benny Goodman's jazz talents; however, many of the technical challenges were above Goodman's confidence level, and the original score shows several alterations by Goodman to bring down higher notes, making it easier to play. The manuscript page of the original coda has suggested changes by Goodman in pencil, and the memo on top reads:
"1st version —later revised— of Coda of Clarinet Concerto (too difficult for Benny Goodman)"

Recently, performances of the restored original version have been given by Charles Neidich and Andrew Simon, amongst others. In the liner notes of the Chandos CD Composers in New York, Charles Neidich writes:
"...of that [1948] coda, complete with a tremendously brilliant clarinet part: cascading arpeggios which [Copland] decided were too difficult for the clarinet and which in the revised version he gave to the piano."

Only a few recordings of this version have been made (see the discography section below).

The concerto contains other notable references such as material from “The Cummington Story”, an "Office of War Information Documentary" (written in 1945) which sets the stage for the film's church-centered small town.  It is the refugees’ theme from the unpublished film score that is used in the concerto.

Discography

Recordings on LP 
Gervase de Peyer. Copland, Clarinet Concerto. Unicorn Records RHS314  ?, (p) ~1972
Paul Drushler. Version with piano. Mark 3344
Benny Goodman. Aaron Copland conducts his clarinet concerto. Columbia Masterworks MS 6497, (p) 1963
Benny Goodman. Meeting at the Summit. Columbia MS6805  ?, (p) ?

Recordings available on CD 
Laura Ardan. American Classics. Naxos 8.559069,  2001, (p) 2001
Dimitri Ashkenazy. Concertos For Clarinet. PAN Classics 510 107,  1998, (p) 1998
Reto Bieri. Portrait. PAN Classics 510 144,  2001, (p) 2001
William Blount, Music for the Theatre. Music Masters MM601621  1988
Eduard Brunner. Hommage à Benny Goodman. Koch Schwann 3-1035-2,  1992, (p) 1992
Philippe Cuper. Concertos For Clarinet & Orchestra. ADDA 581315,  1992, (p) 1993
Karin Dornbusch. Barber, Copland, Ginastera. Caprice CAP 21591,  1998, (p) 1998
Stanley Drucker. Copland: El Salon Mexico/Concerto for Clarinet and String Orchestra/Music for the Theatre/Connotations for Orchestra. Deutsche Grammophon 431 672–2  1991, (p) 1991
Kim Ellis.  The Music of Copland and McKinley. Navona NV5812, 2008
Martin Fröst. Martin Fröst Plays Concertos Dedicated To Benny Goodman. BIS CD-893,  1997, (p) 1998
Benny Goodman. Benny Goodman Collector's Edition. CBS MK42227,  1986, (p) 1986
Benny Goodman. Reiner & Goodman. Legend  LGD122,  1951, (p) 1994
Gary Gray. Clarinet Concertos. Centaur CRC 2212,  1994, (p) 1994
Janet Hilton. Clarinet Concertos. CHAN 8618,  1988, (p) 1988
Sharon Kam. American Classics. Teldec Classics 8573-88482-2  2002, (p) 2002
Sharon Kam. I got Rhythm, American Classics. Teldec Classics WPCS-11205 (8573-88482-2)  2002, (p) 2002
George MacDonald. Clarinet Concertos.... ASV CD DCA568,  1986, (p) 1986
Jon Manasse. 3 Clarinet Concertos. XLNT Music CD-18011,  2004, (p) 2004
Jon Manasse. Sounds of America. Recursive Classics RC3139941, (p) 2021
Paul Meyer. Clarinet Concertos. DENON CO-75289,  1993, (p) 1993
Sabine Meyer. Homage To Benny Goodman. EMI Classics 7243 5 56652 2 5,  1998, (p) 1998
Arne Møller. Et Clarinet portræt. Classico CLASSCD514,  1964, (p) 2004
Charles Neidich. Composers in New-York. Chandos digital CHAN 9848,  2000, (p) 2000
Daniel Pacitti. Works For Clarinet. Agora Musica AG026,  1995
Ludmila Peterková. Scaramouche And Other Concertos For Clarinet. Supraphon SU 3348-2031,  1997, (p) 1997
Robert Plane. American Landmarks. BBC MM205 DDD  2001, (p) 2001
David Shifrin. Clarinet Concerto.... EMI CDC 7 49095 2,  1989, (p) 1989
Robert Spring. American Jazz Concertos. Summit Records DCD-1019,  2003, (p) 2003
Richard Stoltzman. Copland-Corigliano, Clarinet Concertos. RCA Victor Red Seal RD 87762,  1988, (p) 1988
Richard Stoltzman. Copland Clarinet Concerto. RCA Victor Red Seal 09026 61790 2,  1993, (p) 1993
Richard Stoltzman. The Essential Clarinet. RCA 61360,  1988, (p) 1992
 Sarah Williamson. Copland Clarinet Concerto. Somm New Horizons. B003L1N4PI, 2010
Andrzej Wojciechowski. A Tribute to Benny Goodman. DUX 1266, 2016

Recordings of the original 1948 version
Reto Bieri. Portrait. PAN Classics 510 144,  2001, (p) 2001
Charles Neidich. Composers in New-York. Chandos digital CHAN 9848,  2000, (p) 2000
Martin Fröst. Dances to a Black Pipe. BIS-SACD-1863, 2011, (p) 2011

Recording of performance directed by the composer
Benny Goodman. Benny Goodman Collector's Edition. CBS MK42227,  1986, (p) 1986

Recording of the first radio performance
Benny Goodman. Reiner & Goodman. Legend  LGD122,  1951, (p) 1994

Recordings available on DVD 
Richard Stoltzman. Concerto. RCA Victor BVBC-34002,  1993, (p) 1993

References

External links
Good Music Guide
Goodman/Copland, The Clarinet BBoard on Copland Clarinet Concerto
Video - Aaron Copland - Clarinet Concerto (21:23).

Compositions by Aaron Copland
Copland
1949 compositions